Oxazolam is a drug that is a benzodiazepine derivative. It has anxiolytic, anticonvulsant, sedative, and skeletal muscle relaxant properties. It is a prodrug for desmethyldiazepam.

See also
Benzodiazepine

References

Chloroarenes
GABAA receptor positive allosteric modulators
Lactams
Oxazolobenzodiazepines
Prodrugs